Halton Hills Christian School (HHCS) is an independent Christian school located in Halton Hills, Ontario, Canada. HHCS is a member of the Edvance Christian School Association.

History
In January 1957, a group of parents began plans for a Christian school. In October 1960, the school became incorporated as Georgetown District Christian School and gradually enough money was accumulated to buy the eight acre property on which the school now stands. The school was dedicated for service in 1965. Psalm 111:10, was chosen for the cornerstone: "For reverence of the Lord is the beginning of wisdom." During the first school year, HHCS had three classrooms, 99 students, and three staff members. Since opening, the school building has been enlarged four times in order to accommodate an increasing number of students. A preschool for children four years old was started in 1997.

In the fall of 2008, a process of re-branding was initiated by the board and development committee. In the spring of 2009, a new name and logo were presented and approved by the school membership. The school's name was officially changed in September 2009 from Georgetown District Christian School, to Halton Hills Christian School.

Academics
The school offers courses in art, Bible, French, language arts, spelling, mathematics, social sciences, music, and physical education. HHCS runs an enrichment program called "CEIADA" (Christian Education in a Digital Age), wherein students from various schools in the lower Ontario area take part in projects such as making their own autobiography and posting it on YouTube, writing a Wikipedia article on their school, and recording podcasts to be posted on iTunes.

Co-curricular
Choirs perform for local churches and nursing homes on ongoing basis during the year.

Every other year, students in grade 1–8 participate in a science fair. Projects from grades 7 and 8 are selected to compete at the provincial level. 

Chapels are held once a month.

Every winter, the school participates in a food drive for the local food bank, collects items for Operation Christmas Child, and hosts a toy drive during Christmas.

Each year the students and staff host a musical production to celebrate a Christian holiday. All students from pre-school to grade 8 participate.

Harmony Preschool 
Harmony Preschool is affiliated with Halton Hills Christian School. The staff and students come from many different Christian denominations.

Arrowsmith
Following the methods developed by Barbara Arrowsmith Young of Toronto, HHCS started a cognitive abilities class to support students with learning disabilities.

HHCS has students coming and going out of the Arrowsmith room for 50%, 62%, or 74% of the school day, depending on their individual program. To assist them, they have two teachers who are trained in the Arrowsmith methodology, and one teaching assistant to aid in the classroom activities.

Renovation
Halton Hills Christian School renovated their school in 2013.

References

http://www.haltonhillschristianschool.org/

http://www.hh-cs.org/

http://www.ceiada.org/

http://www.arrowsmithschool.org/

Elementary schools in the Regional Municipality of Halton
Halton Hills